Nathan Bedford Forrest III (April 6, 1905 – June 13, 1943) was a brigadier general of the United States Army Air Forces, and a great-grandson of Confederate general Nathan Bedford Forrest. He was killed in action in Germany during World War II. Forrest was the first American general to be killed in action during the war in Europe.

Early life and education
Forrest was born in Memphis, Tennessee, on April 6, 1905, the son of Nathan Bedford Forrest II and Mattie Patterson (Patton).  On November 22, 1930, he married Frances Brassler. According to the Arlington National Cemetery website, he had no children, making him the final male Forrest in his great-grandfather's legitimate direct line.

He graduated from West Point in 1928 and was commissioned a second lieutenant in the cavalry. In 1929, he transferred to the Air Corps and gained rank rapidly.

Career
Promoted to brigadier general in 1942, Forrest was serving as chief of staff of the Second Air Force when he flew missions as an observer with the Eighth Air Force in England. He was reported missing in action when the B-17 Flying Fortress he was in, leading a bombing raid on the German submarine yards at Kiel, went down on June 13, 1943. The other squadron members reported seeing parachutes and hoped the general had survived. However, Forrest was found dead on September 23, 1943, when his body washed up near a seaplane base on Rügen in Germany. He was buried on September 28, 1943, in a small cemetery near Wiek, Rügen.

His family was presented his Distinguished Service Cross, which he was awarded posthumously for staying at the controls of his B-17 bomber while his crew bailed out. The plane exploded before Forrest could bail out. By the time the Seenotdienst (the German air-sea rescue) arrived, only one of the crew was still alive in the water.

Legacy
In 1947, two years after the war ended, his widow requested that he be returned to the United States and buried in Arlington National Cemetery. He was buried in Section 11 at Arlington on November 15, 1949.

See also
List of people who disappeared mysteriously at sea

Dates of rank
 June 9, 1928 second lieutenant
 February 4, 1934, first lieutenant
 June 9, 1938, captain
 January 31, 1941, major
 January 5, 1942, lieutenant colonel
 March 1, 1942, colonel
 November 2, 1942, brigadier general
Source:

In popular culture
Alternate history novelist Harry Turtledove makes Forrest III a significant character in the Southern Victory series, and a minor character in the standalone novel Joe Steele. The Southern Victory version (an officer of a still-extant Confederacy, which has become analogous to Nazi Germany), leads a July 20-style coup attempt against Hitleresque Confederate President Jake Featherston.

See also
 Thomas Jonathan Jackson Christian Jr., another great-grandson of a notable Confederate general who was a high-ranking USAAF pilot killed in action in the ETO in World War II

References

1905 births
1940s missing person cases
1943 deaths
Aerial disappearances of military personnel in action
Aviators killed by being shot down
Burials at Arlington National Cemetery
Formerly missing people
Forrest family
Missing in action of World War II
Missing person cases in Germany
People from Memphis, Tennessee
People lost at sea
People who died at sea
Recipients of the Distinguished Flying Cross (United States)
United States Army Air Forces generals
United States Army Air Forces generals of World War II
United States Army Air Forces personnel killed in World War II
United States Army Air Forces pilots of World War II
United States Military Academy alumni
United States Army officers